Rhene lingularis is a species of jumping spider in the genus Rhene that can be found in South Africa. The male was first identified in 2011. It is typical of the genus, and is small, dark brown and hairy. The spider is distinguished by its tongue-shaped embolus, from which its species name derives.

Taxonomy
Rhene lingularis was first identified by Charles Haddad and Wanda Wesołowska in 2011. It was allocated to the genus Rhene, which is named after the Greek female name, shared by mythological figures. The species name derives from the Latin lingula, meaning tongue, and refers to the distinctive shape of the embolus.

Description
Rhene lingularis is typical for the genus. It small and dark brown with numerous white hairs over its body. The distinctive embolus is longer than other members of the genus and extends from an oval palpal bulb.

Distribution
The species has been found in South Africa, in both Free State and Western Cape.

References

Endemic fauna of South Africa
Salticidae
Spiders described in 2011
Spiders of South Africa